Muttonbirding is the seasonal harvesting of the chicks of petrels, especially shearwater species, for food, oil and feathers by recreational or commercial hunters. Such hunting of petrels and other seabirds has occurred in various locations since prehistoric times, and there is evidence that many island populations have become extinct as a result. More recently ‘muttonbirding’ usually refers to the regulated and sustainable harvesting of shearwaters in Australia and New Zealand.  These include the short-tailed shearwater, also known as the yolla or Australian muttonbird, in Bass Strait, Tasmania, as well as the sooty shearwater, also known as the titi or New Zealand muttonbird, on several small islands known as the Muttonbird Islands, scattered around  Stewart Island in the far south of New Zealand.

Australia
Licensed commercial harvesting of short-tailed shearwater chicks on the coast and islands of Tasmania began in 1903, although it had long been a traditional form of subsistence harvesting by Aboriginal Tasmanians and European settlers there.  However, by the late 20th century the industry was declining due to falling demand for the product and reduced interest by younger Indigenous people in the main area of activity, the islands of the Furneaux Group.

New Zealand
The harvesting of sooty shearwater chicks on 36 islands, known as the Titi or Muttonbird Islands, around Rakiura (Stewart Island), is managed entirely by Rakiura Māori, with about 250,000 being harvested each year. There is some evidence that this harvest has been occurring since at least the 17th century.

Muttonbirds
Muttonbird may refer to various seabirds, particularly petrels in the genus Puffinus, called shearwaters, where the young birds are harvested for food and oil by being extracted by hand from the nesting burrows before they fledge. The English term "muttonbird" originally emerged among settlers on Norfolk Island as the strong taste and fattiness of these birds' meat was likened to mutton. Others have compared it to fish or seafood in flavour. Some species are:
 Short-tailed shearwater, a seabird that nests in south-eastern Australia, particularly in the Furneaux Group of islands in eastern Bass Strait
 Sooty shearwater, a seabird that nests mainly in New Zealand and islands in the South Atlantic Ocean
 Wedge-tailed shearwater, found throughout the tropical and subtropical parts of the Indian and Pacific Oceans
 Manx shearwater, breeding in the North Atlantic region, was harvested in historical times
 Cape Verde shearwater, breeding in the Cape Verde archipelago of the Atlantic Ocean, has declined because of over-harvesting
 Grey-faced petrel (Pterodroma gouldi)
 Providence petrels, harvested to extinction on Norfolk Island in the early 19th century but still existing on Lord Howe Island, were known as 'muttonbirds' or 'flying sheep'

See also
 Faroese puffin

References

Further reading
 Adam-Smith, Patsy. (1965). Moonbird People. Rigby: Adelaide. (About the Furneaux group of islands in Bass Strait, the muttonbirds that inhabit them and the people who make their living from them).

External links
 Keep the Titi Forever
 Migration of sooty shearwater from New Zealand to the north Pacific – TerraNature article
 Muttonbird recipes
 Muttonbirding in New Zealand
 Stop muttonbird slaughter – AACT article
 A Seaweed Pantry – Tales from Te Papa Episode 100 – A short YouTube video about muttonbirding

Game birds
Bird mortality
Poultry dishes
Māori cuisine
Society of New Zealand
Māori society
Hunting in New Zealand
Bird hunting
Seabirds